IBC Headliners was the hourly news update of the sequestered television station in the Philippines, Intercontinental Broadcasting Corporation through IBC News and Public Affairs. The program initially aired from April 4, 1994, to August 5, 2011, replacing the first incarnation of IBC NewsBreak and was replaced by the second incarnation of IBC NewsBreak. The show returned from October 25, 2021 to November 19, 2021, replacing the second incarnation of IBC NewsBreak and was replaced by IBC Express Balita.

On October 20, 2021, IBC announced that the news program would resume airing on October 25, 2021. This edition only lasted for a month.

Former Anchors
Roan Sumayao
Kaye Langit-Luistro
Ida Marie Bernasconi
Karen Tayao-Cabrera
E.R. Ejercito
Maricel Halili
Florida Padilla
Alvin Sejera
Atty. Aline Brosoto
Adrian Ayalin
Toff Rada
Thea Gavino
Abby Gonzales
Bernadette Sembrano
Julius Segovia
Grace Choa
Manuel Llige
Neil Santos III
Tintin Pizarro
Alice Noel
Jake Morales
Jinky Baticados (2021)
Jess Caduco (2021)
Bryan Ellis Castillo (2021)

References

See also
List of programs previously broadcast by Intercontinental Broadcasting Corporation

Philippine television news shows
1990s Philippine television series
2000s Philippine television series
2020s Philippine television series
1994 Philippine television series debuts
2011 Philippine television series endings
2021 Philippine television series debuts
2021 Philippine television series endings
Intercontinental Broadcasting Corporation news shows
IBC News and Public Affairs shows
Intercontinental Broadcasting Corporation original programming
Filipino-language television shows
English-language television shows